Aaron of Alexandria was a physician active in the 7th century. His works were translated into Arabic and Syriac, and were used later by al-Razi.

Life and works

Aaron wrote 30 books on medicine, the "Pandects". He was the first medical author in antiquity who mentioned the diseases of small pox and measles.

Notes

External links
 
 

Ancient Alexandrians
7th-century Egyptian people
7th-century physicians